State Route 237 (SR 237) is an east–west secondary state highway located entirely in Montgomery County in Middle Tennessee.

Route description 
SR 237 begins at a junction with Warfield Boulevard (SR 374) on the east side of Clarksville. It crosses Interstate 24 (I-24) and ends at a junction with SR 238 north of Port Royal.

Major intersections

References

237
237
Transportation in Clarksville, Tennessee